The 1927 Massachusetts Aggies football team represented Massachusetts Agricultural College in the 1927 college football season. The team was a member of the New England Conference, although they did not play other teams in the conference this season. The team was coached by Harold Gore and played its home games at Alumni Field in Amherst, Massachusetts. The 1927 season was Gore's last with the Aggies, as he finished his coaching career with a record of 33–32–5. It was also their most recent winless season. Massachusetts finished the season with a record of 0–7–1.

Schedule

References

Massachusetts
UMass Minutemen football seasons
College football winless seasons
Massachusetts Aggies football